Chiépo is a town in southern Ivory Coast. It is a sub-prefecture of Divo Department in Lôh-Djiboua Region, Gôh-Djiboua District.

Chiépo was a commune until March 2012, when it became one of 1126 communes nationwide that were abolished.

In 2014, the population of the sub-prefecture of Chiépo was 31,006.

Villages
The 11 villages of the sub-prefecture of Chiépo and their population in 2014 are:

 Brevet (2 748)
 Cfi-Baroko (5 902)
 Chiépo (5 372)
 Divripo (517)
 Gawadougou (1 029)
 Guiguidou (2 333)
 Kétasso (4 142)
 Kokpa (2 573)
 Kpatasso (1 392)
 Siata (1 327)

References

Sub-prefectures of Lôh-Djiboua
Former communes of Ivory Coast